The Christ the King Cathedral,  also known as the Belo Horizonte Cathedral, is a Catholic religious cathedral, currently under construction, located in Belo Horizonte, Minas Gerais, in Brazil. The building is the latest project of the renowned architect Oscar Niemeyer for the city and will be the headquarters of the Archdiocese of Belo Horizonte.

The cathedral is dedicated to Christ the King, according to the election of Bishop Antonio dos Santos Cabral, who arrived in Belo Horizonte in 1922 to install the diocese of the capital. The original proposal for the cathedral location would be today at Milton Campos Square, at the top of Afonso Pena Avenue, in the southern and central region of Belo Horizonte, at a time when there were only three churches in Belo Horizonte: Our Lady of Good Journey, temporary headquarters of the diocese, the Church of St. Joseph and the Church of Our Lady of the Rosary, however, the site chosen for the building was a plot on the Cristiano Machado Avenue in the north of the city .

The work, funded by donations, began in 2013 and is expected to be completed by 2020.

See also
List of cathedrals in Brazil
Roman Catholicism in Brazil

References

Roman Catholic cathedrals in Minas Gerais
Roman Catholic churches in Belo Horizonte
21st-century Roman Catholic church buildings